Joder is an unincorporated community in Sioux County, Nebraska, United States.  Joder is a former siding along a BNSF Railway line.

History
Joder was formerly called Adelia. A post office was established at Adelia in 1891, and remained in operation until it was discontinued in 1910.

References

Unincorporated communities in Nebraska
Unincorporated communities in Sioux County, Nebraska